Sahit Prizreni (born 23 February 1983) is an Albanian-Australian former freestyle wrestler who is the current president of the Albanian Wrestling Federation from 6 December 2020.

Career

Albania
He participated in Men's freestyle 60 kg at 2008 Summer Olympics. He was eliminated in 1/8 of final losing with Bazar Bazarguruev from Kyrgyzstan.

Prizreni participated in Men's freestyle 60 kg at 2004 Summer Olympics as well where he was ranked on 17th place. He won a bronze medal on 2007 FILA Wrestling World Championships.

Australia
Prizreni won the 63 kg final at the 2016 African & Oceania Wrestling Olympic Qualification Tournament. He was selected for Australia's 2016 Summer Olympic team, becoming the first Australian to have carried another country's flag (Albania) at the Olympic Games.

References

External links
 
 
 
 

1983 births
Living people
People from Kukës
Albanian male sport wrestlers
Olympic wrestlers of Albania
Wrestlers at the 2004 Summer Olympics
Wrestlers at the 2008 Summer Olympics
World Wrestling Championships medalists
European Wrestling Championships medalists
Australian male sport wrestlers
Olympic wrestlers of Australia
Wrestlers at the 2016 Summer Olympics